Hit the Highway is the third studio album by the Scottish folk rock duo the Proclaimers, released in March 1994 by Chrysalis Records. It took them six years to follow their second album, Sunshine on Leith. The album included three singles: "Let's Get Married", "What Makes You Cry?" and "These Arms of Mine". It topped the charts in Scotland, debuting in the top-10 in the UK while also charting in Austria, Canada and Sweden.

Music

Style and sound 
In a review of Hit the Highway, People observed that the band "play back-to-basics, acoustic rock and roll and R&B", further remarking that, despite the band being Scottish, "you can't find music more American" and that the record "invokes [...] legends like [Buddy] Holly and Otis Redding". Joe Stevens of The Daily Pennsylvanian described the music as "heavily influenced by blues and soul" and "almost a throw-back to '60s pop".

Themes 
Hit the Highway included spiritually-angled lyrics, such libretto questioning organised religion ("I Want To Be A Christian"). On the album's religious dimension, Charlie Reid commented, "There's a belief in God, that's for sure [...] I'm very unsure about religion, I'm suspicious of it and I certainly couldn't call myself a Christian as such. But I'm very interested in religion, in trying to reach God in whatever way you do it." Other songs on Hit the Highway narrated matrimony.

Critical reception

Hit the Highway received a mixed critical reception. AllMusics Daevid Jehnzen described the album as "strong" and as having "many fine songs", but arraigned its lack of a "knockout single". Peter Galvin of Rolling Stone was more positive, remarking that the band "reinforce their passionate beliefs with music that is almost anthem-like in its fervor". However, he criticized the band's convictions as having come off "a bit too vehemently".

Track listing

Personnel
Personnel are adapted from the liner notes of Hit the Highway.

The Proclaimers
 Craig Reid – vocals, tambourine 
 Charlie Reid – vocals, acoustic guitar , electric guitar 

Additional musicians
 Stuart Nisbet – acoustic guitar , electric guitar , mandolin , steel guitar 
 Tim Renwick – acoustic guitar , electric guitar , electric slide guitar 
 Jerry Donahue – acoustic guitar , electric guitar 
 Bobby Valentino – fiddle 
 Pete Wingfield – keyboards , piano , Hammond C3 
 Pete Thomas – baritone saxophone , tenor sax 
 Raul D'Oliveira – trumpet 
 Vince Sullivan – trombone 
 Martin Ditcham – percussion 
 Kevin Wilkinson – drums 
 Dave Mattacks – drums 
 Iain Bruce – bass guitar 
 Phil Cranham – bass guitar , fretless bass guitar 

Production
 Pete Wingfield – producer
 Barry Hammond – engineering
 Geoff Pesche – mastering

Charts and certifications

Weekly charts

Certifications

Release history 
A two-CD Collectors Edition of the album was issued in the UK by Chrysalis in 2011, with a remastered version of the studio album and a bonus disc containing B-sides, live-versions and a BBC Radio session track. In 2017, the album was re-released in Europe on vinyl by Parlophone Records.

Notes 

1994 albums
Chrysalis Records albums
The Proclaimers albums